The Queen Charlotte Track is a  long New Zealand walking track between Queen Charlotte Sound and Kenepuru Sound in the Marlborough Sounds. It extends from Meretoto / Ship Cove in the north to Anakiwa in the south.  For most parts, the track leads through native bush along the ridgeline of hills between the sounds, offering good views either side.

From early 2013 on, the Queen Charlotte Track also has become one of the New Zealand Cycle Trails, accessible for mountain bike-level riders.

Description
The track is maintained by the New Zealand Department of Conservation (DOC) and is well formed and easy to follow.  It is one of the most popular tramping tracks in New Zealand, and is also open to mountain biking all year round except for the section from Meretoto / Ship Cove to Kenepuru Saddle, which is closed for mountain biking from December to February.

The walking track leads over mainly clay soil, with bridges over all major streams, and reaches from sea level to 470m high.  It is not a difficult track, however, it is a long track, with the section between Camp Bay and Torea Saddle over 23 km long.  The entire one-way trip can be completed in 3–5 days by foot, or 13 hours by bike (typically split over two days).  Queen Charlotte Track is also popular for day walks, with boat transfer access at Meretoto / Ship Cove, Resolution Bay, Panaruawhiti / Endeavour Inlet, Camp Bay, Tōrea Moua / Tōrea Bay, Mistletoe Bay, and Anakiwa.  Boat transport is available from and to Picton.  Road access was previously possible until August 2022 storms damaged the road with access points at Camp Bay, Torea Saddle, Te Mahia Saddle, and Anakiwa. 

Queen Charlotte Track passes several Department of Conservation campsites, as well as private accommodations, as it crosses private land on some sections.  Side tracks lead to Miritū Bay / Bay of Many Coves and Lochmara Bay.  Adults walking or biking the track require a Queen Charlotte Track Land Cooperative (Q.C.T.L.C.) Pass on Q.C.T.L.C. private land between Kenepuru Saddle and just past Mistletoe Bay.  The fee contributes to track maintenance, enhancement and access.

Location

See also
 New Zealand tramping tracks

References

External links
 
 

Hiking and tramping tracks in New Zealand
Marlborough Region
Marlborough Sounds